The 2009–10 San Diego State men's basketball team represented San Diego State University in the 2009–10 college basketball season. This was head coach Steve Fisher's eleventh season at San Diego State. The Aztecs competed in the Mountain West Conference and played their home games at the Viejas Arena. They finished the season 25–9, 11–5 in MWC play. They won the 2010 Mountain West Conference men's basketball tournament to earn the conference's automatic bid to the 2010 NCAA Division I men's basketball tournament. They earned an 11 seed in the Midwest Region and were defeated by 6 seed and AP #15 Tennessee in the first round.

Off Season

Departures

Incoming Transfers

2009 Recruiting Class

Preseason
In the Mountain West preseason polls, released October 6 at The Mtn. studios in Denver, CO, San Diego State was selected to finish second in the media poll. Jr. Billy White was selected to the preseason MWC first team. Fr. Kawhi Leonard was selected as the preseason freshman of the year.

Roster

Source

Schedule and results

|-
!colspan=9 style=| Exhibition

|-
!colspan=9 style=| Regular Season

|-
!colspan=10 style=| Mountain West tournament

|-
!colspan=10 style=| NCAA tournament

See also
San Diego State Aztecs
2009–10 MWC men's basketball season

References

San Diego State
San Diego State
San Diego State Aztecs men's basketball seasons